Marckell Patterson (born 1979, Eupora, Mississippi) is an American professional basketball player.

He plays as a shooting guard and is a native of Eupora, Mississippi. He is a 1997 graduate of Eupora High School and he played college basketball at Mississippi State University.

References

External links
ESPN player profile

1979 births
Living people
American men's basketball players
Date of birth missing (living people)
Mississippi State Bulldogs men's basketball players
People from Eupora, Mississippi
Shooting guards